Olvidarte Jamas (Always on my Mind) is a 2005 telenovela made by Venevision International in Miami that lasted 118 episodes.  The telenovela starred Venezuelan-American actress Sonya Smith and Mexican actor Gabriel Porras.  The telenovela was written by Veronica Suarez and Omaira Rivero.  It was executively produced by Peter Tinoco and Ana Teresa Arizmendi.  It aired on Univision in the United States.  The theme song "Olvidarte Jamas" (I Am Not Going To Forget You) was sung by Mexican singer Pablo Montero.

Synopsis
Beautiful Victoria has spent 20 years carrying the weight of an unforgivable wrong done to her and waiting for the perfect moment to get even.  When she was just a teenager, poor and naive, she was deceived and seduced by Gonzalo Montero, son of Don Gregorio - the ruthless owner of the ranch where she worked as a peasant, and became pregnant. However, thanks to Gonzalo's infuriated wife, Gladis, who gave Victoria a violent beating, Victoria suffered a miscarriage.  Since then, Victoria, who at the time was known by her real name, Luisa, has been obsessed with making the Monteros pay for her pain.

Now a stunning, rich and mature woman, Luisa/Victoria returns to Florida from California (the series was not really shot there) with her lovely adopted daughter, in search of revenge. She begins by getting a job at the Montero ranch, where Gonzalo, Gladis and Don Gregorio are all immediately intrigued by her, as she uncannily reminds them of someone they would rather forget.

However, vengeance doesn't come as easily as Victoria thought, since she never expected love to interfere with her plans. When she meets Diego, a landowner neighbor of the Monteros, it's love at first sight for both. While tough and inflexible on the surface, Diego is really just a bitter man, a victim of a great injustice, in desperate need of affection for which Victoria is willing to give him without bounds. To complicate matters even more, Victoria's daughter, Carolina, finds true love in Alejandro, Gonzalo Montero's son, making Carolina the cousin of Alejandro.

Victoria realizes that if she wants lasting happiness for herself and her daughter, she must finally let go of the hatred she feels for the Monteros, in spite of the fact that they continue hounding her even today. Will she be able to? What will win out in the end: her unflinching desire for revenge, or the power of love?.

Cast

Main Cast

{| class="wikitable"
|- bgcolor="#CCCCCC"
! Actor || Character || Known as
|-
|Sonya Smith || Luisa Dominguez / Victoria Salinas || Main heroine, adoptive mother of Carolina, in love with Diego
|-
|Gabriel Porras || Diego Ibarra || Main hero, in love with Victoria
|-
|Martha Julia || Lucrecia Montero  || Villain. Daughter of Gregorio, ends in psychiatric clinic
|-
|Mariana Torres || Carolina || Adopted daughter of Victoria, daughter of Florencia, in love with Alejandro
|-
|Daniel Elbittar || Alejandro Montero || Son of Gladis and Gonzalo, in love with Carolina
|-
|Guillermo Murray || Gregorio Montero || Father of Gonzalo, Florencia, Constanza, Lucrecia and Miguel, killed by Gladis
|-
|Sebastián Ligarde || Gonzalo Montero || Villain. Son of Gregorio, husband of Gladis
|-
|Karen Sentíes || Gladis Montero || Villain. Wife of Gonzalo, mother of Alejandro
|-
|Maite Embil || Florencia Montero ||  Daughter of Gregorio, wife of Martin, mother of Carolina.
|-
|Fernando Carrera || Martín de la Nuéz || Artist, husband of Florencia, father of Patricio, friend of Diego, killed by Macario
|-
|Elizabeth Gutiérrez || Isabella || Villain. Former prostitute, girlfriend of Alejandro, in love with Patricio, killed by Renato
|-
|Paulo César Quevedo || Patricio de la Nuéz || Villain. Son of Martín
|-
|Brenda Bezares || Constanza Montero || Daughter of Gregorio, mother of Gerardo and Bianca
|-
|Félix Loreto || Rubén Terán || Husband of Constanza, father of Gerardo and Bianca
|-
|Javier Armenteros || Gerardo || Son of Constanza and Rubén
|-
|Taniusha Capote || Bianca || Daughter of Constanza and Rubén, in love with Claudio
|-
|Rodrigo Vidal || Miguel || Son of Gregorio
|-
|Héctor Soberón || Renato Tuluz || Villain. Father of Alejandro
|-
|Carmen Daysi Rodríguez || Crista || Villain. Lover of Renato
|-
|Adela Romero || Martina || Villain. Maid in Gregorio's house
|-
|Carla Rodríguez || Amalia || Friend of Carolina, in love with Germán
|-
|Carlos Miguel Caballero || Macario || Villain.
|-
|Gloria Zapata || Flora Ibarra || Aunt of Diego
|-
|Hilda Luna || Rocío || Maid in Gregorio's house
|-
|Yaskin Santalucía || Claudio || Friend of Diego, in love with Bianca
|-
|Julio Capote || Salvador "Chema" || Friend of Gregorio and Lencha
|-
|Marisela Buitrago || María || Cook in Diego's house, friend of Victoria
|-
|Roberto Levermann || Edelmiro || In love with Rocío"
|-
|William Levy || Germán Torres || Friend of Diego, in love with Amalia|-
|}

Secondary Cast

Eduardo Linares .... Vicente "Chente"
Candice Michelle .... Layla
Angel Nodal
Andhy Mendez
Ariel Texido - detectiveBrigitte Kali Canales
Carlos Guerrero .... Manuel
Enrique Arredondo
Ernesto Rivas .... Valentín - detectiveFidel Perez Michel - police officerFreddy Viquez .... Samuel- friend of LucreciaGabriel Morales .... young Alejandro Montero
Guadalupe Hernández.... El Pastelero
Hada Bejar .... Lencha Dominguez - grandmother of LuisaJohnny Nessy
Juan Troya .... Ocampo - attorneyKonstantino Vrotsos .... young Miguel
Miguel Gutierrez .... Ramon - doctorPablo Montero - singerVicente Passariello - bodyguard of Renato''
Víctor Corona .... Santos
Virginia Loreto
William Colmenares .... El Verdugo
Héctor Eduardo González.... Public Minister.

Trivia
This is the first of four telenovelas (Acorralada, Pecados Ajenos, Vuélveme A Querer) which Sonya Smith and Mariana Torres star as mother and daughter.

References

Sources
Series Now - Olivdarte Jamas
Olvidarte Jamás at Internet Movie Database

Venezuelan telenovelas
Venevisión telenovelas
American telenovelas
Univision telenovelas
2005 telenovelas
2005 American television series debuts
2005 American television series endings
2005 Venezuelan television series debuts
2005 Venezuelan television series endings
Television shows set in Miami
Television shows filmed in Miami
Spanish-language American telenovelas